Gol Gappe is a 2023 comedy-drama film directed by Smeep Kang. It stars Binnu Dhillon, Rajat Bedi, Ihana Dhillon, Navneet Kaur Dhillon and B. N. Sharma. The film is produced under the banner of Zee Studios, Triflix Entertainment LLP, Janvi Productions, Soham Rockstar Entertainment.

Synopsis
Three friends Jaggi, Pali and Nathuram run a fast-food outlet. Don of Punjab, Bagga kidnaps Dr. Chawla's wife and demands 10 lacs for compensation. A telecommunication mix up occurs and the call gets diverted to the Golgappe outlet.

Cast

Binnu Dhillon as Jaggi
Rajat Bedi as Pali
B. N. Sharma as Nathuram
Ihana Dhillon
Navneet Kaur Dhillon
Dilawar Sidhu

Release

Theatrical
The film was released on 17 February, 
2023 in Cinemas.

Home media
The film will be released on ZEE5 after its theatrical release.

References

External links

2023 films